This was the first edition of the tournament.

Orlando Luz and Marcelo Zormann won the title by walkover after Andrea Collarini and Renzo Olivo withdrew from the final.

Seeds

Draw

References

External links
 Main draw

Brasil Tennis Challenger - Doubles